The 1952 Brown Bears football team represented Brown University during the 1952 college football season. In their second season under head coach Alva Kelley, the Bears compiled a 2–7 record, and were outscored 220 to 89. M. Matteodo was the team captain. Brown played its home games at Brown Stadium in Providence, Rhode Island.

Schedule

References

Brown
Brown Bears football seasons
Brown Bears football